Cordylodus is an extinct genus of conodonts in the family of Cordylodontidae.

Use in stratigraphy 
It is suggested that Cordylodus andresi can be a marker of the Cambrian Stage 10.

Distribution 
Fossils of Cordylodus have been found in Argentina, Australia, Canada (Quebec), China, Colombia (Tarqui, Huila), Kazakhstan, Malaysia, Mexico, Norway, the Russian Federation, Sweden, and the United States, in the states of Alaska, Minnesota, Nevada, New York, Oklahoma (Bromide Formation), Vermont and Wyoming.

C. horridus has been recovered from the Blakely Sandstone and  C. angulatus from the Collier Shale, Ordovician geologic formations in the Ouachita Mountains of Arkansas and Oklahoma.

References

Bibliography

External links 

 

Proconodontida genera
Cambrian conodonts
Paleozoic animals of Asia
Paleozoic animals of Europe
Paleozoic animals of North America
Ordovician Canada
Ordovician Mexico
Ordovician United States
Paleozoic brachiopods of South America
Ordovician Argentina
Ordovician Colombia
Fossils of Colombia
Paleozoic animals of Oceania
Fossil taxa described in 1856
Bromide Formation